The Lure is a 2015 Polish horror musical film directed by Agnieszka Smoczyńska. It tells of two sirens who emerge from the waters and perform in a nightclub. One falls in love with a man, and gives up her tail, but loses her voice in the process. The story is a reworking of the 1837 fairy tale "The Little Mermaid" by Hans Christian Andersen, with inspiration from Smoczyńska's experiences. After a Polish premiere, the film screened at the 2016 Sundance Film Festival and Fantasia Film Festival, to positive reviews.

Plot
Some time in the 1980s, two sirens, Golden and Silver, encounter a rock band, Figs n' Dates, relaxing and playing music on a beach in Poland. They accompany the band back to the nightclub where they regularly perform and begin playing gigs there, performing as strippers and backup singers. The sirens soon become their own act, The Lure, with the band backing them. Golden murders a bar patron after a show one night and continues to thirst for blood; Silver falls in love with the bassist Mietek, but Mietek only sees her as a fish and not a woman.

Golden meets a Triton, a fellow sea creature and singer of a metal band, who informs her that if her sister falls in love and her love marries someone else, she will turn into sea foam; if she is to have her tail removed, she will lose her voice. When Golden's murder victim is discovered, one of the bandmates punches Silver and Golden, and it appears that they die. The bandmates roll their bodies in carpets and throw them into the river. But they return to the club, alive, and the band apologizes. Silver has her tail surgically replaced with a pair of legs to make Mietek love her back, but this makes her lose her singing voice. She tries to have sex with her new lower-half, but Mietek is disgusted when she gets blood on him from her surgery scars.

Mietek later meets a woman in a recording studio, whom he marries. The sisters attend the reception; Golden and the Triton warn Silver that she must eat Mietek before daybreak or she will become sea foam. Silver dances with Mietek, but cannot bring herself to eat him, and turns into sea foam in his arms. Distraught, Golden tears Mietek's throat out and returns to the ocean in full view of the entire wedding party.

Cast

 Marta Mazurek as Silver
 Michalina Olszańska as Golden
 Kinga Preis as the nightclub singer
 Jakub Gierszał as the bass player
 Andrzej Konopka as the drummer
 Zygmunt Malanowicz as the house manager
 Magdalena Cielecka as Divine Furs (strip dancer)
 Katarzyna Herman as the Militia Lieutenant
 Marcin Kowalczyk as The Triton
 Kaya Kołodziejczyk as Crystal

Production

Writing

Director Agnieszka Smoczyńska called the film a "coming-of-age story", echoing her own youth. She recalled that her mother ran a nightclub, where she had her "first shot of vodka, first cigarette, first sexual disappointment and first important feeling for a boy." The mermaids were an abstraction that allowed her to tell her story without revealing too much of herself. The screenwriter Robert Bolesto sought to write a story based on two friends of his that frequented nightclubs in the 80s, which enthused Smoczyńska and resonated with her own childhood.

Smoczyńska also wanted the film to be a retelling of The Little Mermaid by Hans Christian Andersen, and developed her idea of mermaids from tales of the 14th–16th century that described them as the sisters of dragons, and hence made them part monstrous. She invented their need to feed on human hearts and that propensity to attack the larynx of their victims.

Themes
Smoczyńska likened the mermaids to immigrants, abused by the locals (used in the sex industry) on their way to their real goal—America. She added they represent innocence, yet their odour and slime recalled girls maturing, "they menstruate, they ovulate, their bodies start smelling and feeling different." David Ehrlich of IndieWire, noting the mermaids' "bodies are a source of constant fascination", said that "The Lure is having some fun with chauvinist objectification; the film has a funny habit of lambasting dumb misogynist rhetoric by applying it literally."

Release
Córki dancingu premiered in Poland on 25 December 2015. The Lure was later shown in the World Cinema Dramatic Competition section at the 2016 Sundance Film Festival and then the Fantasia Film Festival.

In 2016, American art house distributor Janus Films acquired the rights to distribute The Lure in North America, for a limited release beginning on 1 February 2017. It was afterwards chosen for DVD and Blu-ray release in Region A by The Criterion Collection.

Reception

Critical response
The film had a mixed reception in Poland. On review aggregator website Rotten Tomatoes, the film holds an approval rating of 89% based on 80 reviews, with an average rating of 7.20/10. The website's critical consensus reads, "The Lure adds a sexually charged, genre-defying twist to well-established mermaid lore, more than overpowering its flaws through sheer variety and wild ambition." On Metacritic, the film has a weighted average score of 72 out of 100, based on 19 critics, indicating "generally favorable reviews".

Giuseppe Sedia of the Krakow Post wrote that Smoczynska's debut feature is a "cinematic act of love towards Poland’s capital city in the 1980s with its sparkling neon signs, lighthearted nightlife, and ability to knock back gallons of vodka in its best days". Rubina Ramji, film editor and reviewer for the Journal of Religion and Film, described the film as a "rock opera, a horror movie and fairytale story about mermaids all rolled up into one". Guy Lodge of Variety praised it for its originality, describing it as "never less than arresting, and sometimes even a riot". However, he felt the screenplay lacked ideas in portraying the mermaids' vampiric attributes, and was unsure of the film's 1980s setting and whether it alluded to the politics of the time. IndieWire critic David Ehrlich gave it a B+, calling it "the best goth musical about man-eating mermaids ever made".

Box office
The Lure garnered 14,899 admissions in its opening weekend in Poland from 112 cinemas, finishing at fifth place. The film received 41,776 admissions in total.

On its North American opening weekend in February 2017, The Lure grossed $7,370 in one theatre. It finished its run on 4 May 2017 with a gross of $101,657 total in North America.

Accolades

References

External links
 Kino Świat official site 
 Janus Films official site
 
 
 
 
 
 The Lure: One Is Silver and the Other Gold an essay by Angela Lovell at the Criterion Collection

2015 films
2015 horror films
2010s coming-of-age films
2010s musical films
Films based on The Little Mermaid
Films set in the 1980s
Films set in Poland
2010s Polish-language films
Polish musical films
Films about striptease